Sean Roberts Eddy is Professor of Molecular & Cellular Biology and of Applied Mathematics at Harvard University. Previously he was based at the Janelia Research Campus from 2006 to 2015 in Virginia. His research interests are in bioinformatics, computational biology and biological sequence analysis.  projects include the use of Hidden Markov models in HMMER, Infernal Pfam and Rfam.

Education 
Eddy graduated June, 1982 from Marion Center Area High School, Marion Center, Pennsylvania. He then completed a Bachelor of Science in Biology at California Institute of Technology in 1986, followed by a Doctor of Philosophy in molecular biology at the University of Colorado under the supervision of Larry Gold in 1991 studying the T4 phage.

Career
From 1992 to 1995 he was a postdoctoral research fellow at the Medical Research Council (MRC) Laboratory of Molecular Biology (LMB) in Cambridge UK working with John Sulston and Richard Durbin. From 1995 to 2007 he worked at Washington University School of Medicine and has been working for the Howard Hughes Medical Institute since 2000.

Awards and honours
In 2007, Sean was the winner of the Benjamin Franklin Award in Bioinformatics for contributions to Open Access in the Life Sciences.

In 2022, Eddy was elected as a Fellow of the International Society for Computational Biology.

References 

Living people
American bioinformaticians
Human Genome Project scientists
Howard Hughes Medical Investigators
Washington University in St. Louis mathematicians
21st-century American biologists
Year of birth missing (living people)
Harvard University faculty
Washington University School of Medicine faculty
California Institute of Technology alumni